WSMB may refer to:

 WSMB (FM), a radio station (89.3 FM) licensed to serve Harbor Beach, Michigan, United States
 WMFS (AM), a radio station (680 AM) licensed to serve Memphis, Tennessee, United States, which held the call sign WSMB from 2006 to 2009
 WWWL, New Orleans radio station formerly with call letters WSMB.